The 2012 Green Party of England and Wales leadership election took place in September 2012 to select a leader of the Green Party of England and Wales. The party's incumbent leader, Caroline Lucas, chose not to seek re-election. The position was won by the journalist Natalie Bennett.

Background 

The Green Party of England and Wales elects its leaders every two years. Caroline Lucas was elected as the party's first leader in 2008 and had been re-elected unopposed in 2010. In May 2012, she announced that she wouldn't seek re-election.

Campaign 
The election was contested by Natalie Bennett, a former journalist for The Guardian.

Candidates

Leadership candidates

Deputy leadership candidates

Declined 

The incumbent deputy leader, Adrian Ramsay, was widely expected to contest the leadership election. However, he announced that he would not stand in that election, nor for re-election as deputy leader.

Campaign 

All members of the party were sent ballot papers in the post with their copy of the party's magazine at the beginning of August 2012. Ballots needed to be returned before 31 August 2012.

The result was declared on 3 September 2012. Natalie Bennett was elected leader and Will Duckworth was elected deputy leader.

Result 

The results were as follows:

Leader

Deputy leader 

Under the election rules operating at the time, the deputy leader could not be of the same gender as the leader. Caroline Allen and Alexandra Phillips were thus eliminated and first preference votes cast for them were redistributed to the highest expressed preference for an eligible candidate. No candidate achieved the necessary quota, but the election rules required that "re-open nominations" not be eliminated, so the candidate with the highest vote was elected.

Aftermath 
Bennett said she wanted to get MPs elected in every region, setting a target of ten seats.

References

2012 elections in the United Kingdom
Green Party of England and Wales leadership elections
Green Party of England and Wales leadership election